Henry James Mitchell (22 November 1874 – 11 April 1943) was an Australian rules footballer who played with Melbourne in the Victorian Football League (VFL).

Notes

External links 

1874 births
Australian rules footballers from Melbourne
Carlton Football Club (VFA) players
Melbourne Football Club players
1943 deaths
Melbourne Football Club (VFA) players
People from Essendon, Victoria